Events from the year 1829 in Sweden

Incumbents
 Monarch – Charles XIV John

Events
 21 August – The coronation of queen Désirée Clary in Stockholm.
 - The Chalmers University of Technology is established.
 - Jönköpings SS is founded.
 - Midwives are allowed to use surgical instruments, which are unique in Europe at the time and gives them surgical status.

Births
 21 January – Oscar II of Sweden, monarch   (died 1907) 
 26 April – Eva Brag, journalist, novelist and poet  (died 1913)
 2 July – Martis Karin Ersdotter, businessperson (died 1902)
 14 October – August Malmström, painter (died 1901)
 3 December – Augusta Björkenstam, countess and businessperson (died 1892) 
 Hanna Hammarström, inventor (died 1909)
 Emanuella Carlbeck, pioneer in the education of students with Intellectual disability (died 1901)

Deaths

 17 March - Sophia Albertina, Abbess of Quedlinburg (born 1753)
 9 November  - Carl Gustaf af Leopold, poet (born 1756)

References

 
Years of the 19th century in Sweden